Speight House and Cotton Gin is a historic home and cotton gin located at Edenton, Chowan County, North Carolina. It was built in 1900, and is a two-story, "L"-shaped, Queen Anne-style brick dwelling with a hipped roof.  It features three full-height projecting demi-octagonal bays and spacious wraparound verandah.  The cotton gin was built about 1901–1902, and is a brick "L"-shaped building with a one-story main block and two-story ell. Also on the property are a contributing smokehouse and other dependencies.

It was listed on the National Register of Historic Places in 1980.

References

Houses on the National Register of Historic Places in North Carolina
Queen Anne architecture in North Carolina
Houses completed in 1900
Houses in Chowan County, North Carolina
National Register of Historic Places in Chowan County, North Carolina